Betka Union is a union parishad under Tongibari Upazila of Munshiganj District in the Dhaka Division of central Bangladesh.

Demographics 
The population includes 11,459  males and 9,376 females.

Infrastructure 
The area hosts a post office, two banks and an ATM booth along with a market.

Health 
Two community health centers are located there.

Agriculture 
The area hosts 37 Arat of Potatoes, 5 Arat of Betel Nut and 4 Potatoes Cold Storages

Roads 
Roads cover 32400 km of roads. 5,400 km are paved, 1,000 km are brick and the remaining 26,002 km are dirt.

Villages and population
 Chotfotiya - 226
 Uttor Rayapura - 852
 Sundalpura - 805
 Gorkula - 127
 Pirate Mahamudatpur - 546
 North Betka - 4,487
 Khilpara - 3,172
 South Betka - 2,304
 Changuri - 2,091
 Randhonibari - 1,295 
 Kandapara - 
 Dwipara -
 South Raypur - 605

Education

Government primary schools

| 09 ||Dokkhin Betka Government primary school

Secondary And Higher Secondary Schools
 Betka Union High School
 Paik Para Union High School

Madrasas
 Betka Darulalom Kawmia Madrasah
 Uttor Raipur Siddikia Abdul Islamia Dakhil Madrasah
 Uttar Sunarong Darul Ulum Madrasa
 Dakshin Betka D Muhammed Hossain Islamia Hafijiya Madrasa And Etim Khana
 Changuri Hafijiya Nurani Madrasa O Etim Khana

Religion 

The area supports 31 mosques, including:
 Khilpara Baitul Aman Jame Mosque  
 Betka Bazar Jame Mosque   
 Big Chatfatia Jame Mosque
 Chatfatia Jame Mosque
 Char MahamudatPur Jame Mosque
 Uttar Raipur Jame Mosque
 Uttar Sunarong Jame Masjid
 Natun Bazar Jame Masjid
 Hawlader Bari Baitun Noor Jame Masjid
 Changuri Puraton Jame Mosque
 Changuri Nura Mohammadi Al-Aiksa Jame Mosque

Orphan
 Dakshin Betka D Muhammed Hossain Islamia Hafijiya Madrasa And Etim Khana

See also
 Upazilas of Bangladesh
 Districts of Bangladesh
 Divisions of Bangladesh

References 

Munshiganj District
Unions of Tongibari Upazila